National League 2 East is a new rugby union league at level four in the English rugby union system and provides semi-professional competition for teams in London, South East England and East of England. The remainder of England is covered by two other regional leagues; National League 2 North and National League 2 West.

The champion club is promoted to National One. The last two teams are relegated to either Regional 1 South Central or Regional 1 South East.

Current season

League table

See also
 English rugby union system
 History of the English rugby union system
 National League 2 North
 National League 2 West

References

External links
 NCA Rugby

 
4
Recurring sporting events established in 2022
Sports leagues established in 2022